Mamma Mia! (promoted as Mamma Mia! The Movie) is a 2008 jukebox musical romantic comedy film directed by Phyllida Lloyd and written by Catherine Johnson, based on her book from the 1999 musical of the same name. The film is based on the songs of pop group ABBA, with additional music composed by ABBA member Benny Andersson. The film features an ensemble cast, including Christine Baranski, Pierce Brosnan, Dominic Cooper, Colin Firth, Amanda Seyfried, Stellan Skarsgård, Meryl Streep, and Julie Walters. The plot follows a young bride-to-be who invites three men to her upcoming wedding, with the possibility that any of them could be her father. The film was an international co-production between Germany, the United Kingdom and the United States, and was co-produced by Playtone and Littlestar Productions.

Principal photography primarily took place on the island of Skopelos, Greece from August to September 2007. The film was distributed by Universal Pictures. Mamma Mia! held its world premiere on June 30, 2008, at Leicester Square in London and premiered on July 4, 2008, in Stockholm, Sweden, with ABBA members Benny Andersson, Björn Ulvaeus, Anni-Frid Lyngstad and Agnetha Fältskog in attendance. The film was released theatrically on July 10 in the United Kingdom, on July 17 in Germany and on July 18 in the United States. It received mixed reviews from critics, who praised the musical numbers and production values but criticized the casting of inexperienced singers and campy tone. The film grossed $611 million worldwide on a $52 million budget, becoming the fifth highest-grossing film of 2008. A sequel Mamma Mia! Here We Go Again was released on July 20, 2018, with much of the cast returning.

Plot

On the fictional Greek island of Kalokairi, bride-to-be Sophie Sheridan reveals to her bridesmaids that she has secretly invited three men to her wedding without telling her mother, Donna. They are the men with whom her mother's diary reveals she had sex during the 25-day period that was coincident with Sophie's conception: Irish-American architect Sam Carmichael, Swedish travel writer Bill Anderson, and British banker Harry Bright. She hopes that her father will give her away and believes that after she spends time with them, she will know which is her father.

That day, the three men arrive on Kalokairi. She does not reveal that she believes that one of them is her father, but does explain that it was she who sent the wedding invitations, not Donna. She hides them in Donna's goat house, and they hesitantly agree not to reveal themselves yet. As Donna is working on the goat house, spies on them and is dumbfounded to find herself facing her former lovers, demanding that they leave. She confides in Tanya and Rosie that she truly does not know which of the three fathered Sophie. Sophie finds the men aboard Bill's sailboat, and they sail around Kalokairi, telling stories of Donna's carefree youth. Sophie attempts to tell her fiancé, Sky, about her ploy but loses her nerve.

At Sophie's bachelorette party, Donna is distressed by the presence of the three men, but Rosie and Tanya assure her that they will take care of them. Sophie decides to talk with each of the men alone, but leaves Sam and Harry questioning their trip. She learns from Bill that Donna received the money for her villa from his great-aunt Sofia. Sophie comes to believe that Bill is her father; she asks him to give her away and keep their secret until the wedding. Sophie's happiness is short-lived, as Sam and Harry each pull her aside to tell her that they are her father and that they will give her away. In the morning, Donna attempts to comfort Sophie and promises to cancel the wedding; Sophie angrily reacts to this, saying she only wants to avoid her mother's mistakes. Sam attempts to discuss the wedding with Donna, and both of them realize they still have feelings for each other. 

Sophie admits her actions to Sky and asks for his help, but he reacts angrily to Sophie's deception. As Sophie gets ready for the wedding, Donna admits to her that her mother disowned her after she got pregnant, and that she couldn't be more proud of having her. Donna promises to give Sophie away. As the bridal party walks to the chapel, Sam intercepts Donna, who reveals the pain she felt over losing him. At the wedding. Sam reveals that he did not go through with his engagement, but returned to find Donna with another man (Bill). The three men agree with Sophie that they do not want the paternity confirmed, each agreeing to be one-third of a father for Sophie. Knowing what both of them want, Sophie suggests to Sky that they postpone their wedding and travel the world. Sam proposes to Donna, revealing that he’s now divorced and has loved her all this time, which she happily accepts.

Cast

Main cast 
 Meryl Streep as Donna Sheridan-Carmichael, Sophie's mother, owner of the hotel Villa Donna.
 Amanda Seyfried  as Sophie Sheridan, Donna's 20-year-old daughter, Sky's fiancée.
 Christine Baranski as Tanya Chesham-Leigh, one of Donna's former bandmates in Donna and the Dynamos; a rich three-time divorcee.
 Julie Walters as Rosie Mulligan, Donna's other former bandmate; an unmarried, fun-loving author.
 Pierce Brosnan as Sam Carmichael, Sophie's possible father and an Irish-American architect.
 Colin Firth as Harry Bright, Sophie's possible father and a British banker.
 Stellan Skarsgård as Bill Anderson, Sophie's possible father, a Swedish sailor and travel writer.
 Dominic Cooper as Sky Ramand, Sophie's fiancé who is designing a website for the hotel.
 Niall Buggy as Father Alex, a wedding priest.
 Chris Jarvis as Eddie, a friend of Sky and Pepper.
 Ashley Lilley as Ali, a close friend of Sophie and her bridesmaid.
 Rachel McDowall as Lisa, a close friend of Sophie and her bridesmaid.
 Philip Michael as Pepper, Sky's best man who likes Tanya; a bartender.
 Juan Pablo Di Pace as Petros, Harry's partner.
 Enzo Squillino as Gregoris, one of Donna's employees.
 Ricardo Montez as Stavros.

Cameo appearances and uncredited roles

Benny Andersson as "Dancing Queen" piano player
 Spencer Kayden as Agnes
 Björn Ulvaeus as Greek god
 Rita Wilson as Greek goddess

Soundtrack

A soundtrack album was released on July 7, 2008, by Decca in the United States and Polydor internationally. The recording was produced by Benny Andersson. The album features sixteen musical numbers from the film, including a hidden track. The album was nominated at the 51st Annual Grammy Awards for Best Compilation Soundtrack Album for Motion Picture, Television or Other Visual Media. The deluxe edition of the soundtrack album was released on November 25, 2008.

 "I Have a Dream" – Sophie
 "Honey, Honey" – Sophie, Ali and Lisa
 "Money, Money, Money" – Donna, Tanya and Rosie
 "Mamma Mia" – Donna
 "Chiquitita" – Rosie, Tanya and Donna†
 "Dancing Queen" – Tanya, Rosie and Donna
 "Our Last Summer" – Harry, Bill, Sam, Sophie and Donna
 "Lay All Your Love on Me" – Sky and Sophie
 "Super Trouper" – Donna, Tanya and Rosie
 "Gimme! Gimme! Gimme! (A Man After Midnight)" – Sophie, Ali and Lisa
 "Voulez-Vous" – Donna, Sam, Tanya, Rosie, Harry, Bill, Sky, Ali, Lisa and Pepper
 "SOS" – Sam and Donna
 "Does Your Mother Know" – Tanya and Pepper
 "Slipping Through My Fingers" – Donna and Sophie
 "The Winner Takes It All" – Donna
 "I Do, I Do, I Do, I Do, I Do" – Sam and Donna†
 "When All Is Said and Done"  – Sam and Donna
 "Take a Chance on Me" – Rosie, Bill, Tanya, Pepper, and Harry
 "Mamma Mia" – Donna, Tanya, Rosie, Harry, Sam, Bill, Sky, Sophie, Ali, Lisa, Pepper
 "I Have a Dream" – Sophie
 "Dancing Queen" – Tanya, Rosie, and Donna
 "Waterloo" – Donna, Rosie, Tanya, Sam, Bill, Harry, Sky, and Sophie†
 "Thank You for the Music" – Sophie§

† Featured in the film, but omitted from the soundtrack album.
§ Included on the soundtrack album as a hidden track.

Production

Most of the outdoor scenes were filmed on location at the small Greek island of Skopelos, in Thessaly (during August 29-September 2007), and the seaside hamlet of Damouchari in the Pelion area of Greece. On Skopelos, Kastani beach on the southwest coast was the film's main location site. The producers built a beach bar and jetty along the beach, but removed both set pieces after production wrapped. A complete set for Donna's Greek villa was built at the 007 stage at Pinewood Studios and most of the film was shot there. Real trees were used for the set, watered daily through an automated watering system, and given access to daylight in order to keep them growing.

The part of the film where Brosnan's character, Sam, leaves his New York office to go to the Greek Island was actually filmed at the Lloyd's building on Lime Street in the City of London. He dashes down the escalators and through the porte-cochere, where yellow cabs and actors representing New York mounted police were used for verisimilitude.

The Fernando, Bill Anderson's yacht (actually a ketch) in the film was the Tai-Mo-Shan, built in 1934 by H. S. Rouse at the Hong Kong and Whampoa dockyards.

Meryl Streep took opera singing lessons as a child, and as an adult, she had previously sung in several films, including Postcards from the Edge, Silkwood, Death Becomes Her, and A Prairie Home Companion. She was a fan of the stage show Mamma Mia! after seeing it on Broadway in September 2001, saying that she found the show to be an affirmation of life in the midst of the destruction of 9/11.

Release
Though the world premiere of the film occurred elsewhere, most of the media attention was focused on the Swedish premiere, where Anni-Frid Lyngstad and Agnetha Fältskog joined Björn Ulvaeus and Benny Andersson with the cast at the Rival Theatre in Mariatorget, Stockholm, owned by Andersson, on July 4, 2008. It was the first time all four members of ABBA had been photographed together since 1986.

Home media
In November 2008, Mamma Mia! became the fastest-selling DVD of all time in the UK, according to Official UK Charts Company figures. It sold 1,669,084 copies on its first day of release, breaking the previous record (held by Titanic) by 560,000 copies. By the end of 2008, the Official UK Charts Company declared that it had become the biggest selling DVD ever in the UK, with one in every four households owning a copy (over 5 million copies sold). The record was previously held by Pirates of the Caribbean: The Curse of the Black Pearl with sales of 4.7 million copies.

In the United States, the DVD made over $30 million on its first day of release. Mamma Mia! was released on DVD and Blu-ray on December 16, 2008. By December 31, 2008, Mamma Mia! became the bestselling DVD of all time in Sweden with 545,000 copies sold.

Reception

Box office
In the United Kingdom, Mamma Mia! grossed £69.2 million as of January 23, 2009; it is the thirteenth highest-grossing film of all time at the UK box office. The film opened at #1 in the U.K, taking £6.6 million on 496 screens. It managed to hold on to the top spot for 2 weeks, narrowly keeping Pixar's WALL-E from reaching #1 in its second week.

When released on July 3, 2009, in Greece, the film grossed $1.6 million in its opening weekend, ranking #1 at the Greek box office.

Mamma Mia! grossed $144.2 million in the United States and $467.1 million in other territories for a worldwide total of $611.3 million, against a production budget of $52 million. It became the highest grossing live-action musical of all time, until it was surpassed by Bill Condon's Beauty and the Beast in 2017. It was also the highest-grossing movie directed by a woman, until it was surpassed by Patty Jenkins' Wonder Woman in 2017.  It is the third highest-grossing film of 2008 internationally (i.e. outside North America) with an international total of $458.4 million and the thirteenth highest gross of 2008 in North America (the US and Canada) with $144.1 million.

The film made $9.6 million on its opening day in the United States and Canada, as well as $27.6 million on its opening weekend, ranking #2 at the box office, behind The Dark Knight. At the time, it made Mamma Mia! the record-holder for the highest grossing opening weekend for a movie based on a Broadway musical, surpassing Hairsprays box office record in 2007 and later surpassed by Into the Woods.

Critical response

On Rotten Tomatoes, the film holds an approval rating of 55% based on 183 reviews and an average rating of 5.60/10. The website's critical consensus reads, "This jukebox musical is full of fluffy fun but rough singing voices and a campy tone might not make you feel like 'You Can Dance' the whole 90 minutes." On Metacritic, the film has a weighted average score of 51 out of 100, based on 37 critics, indicating "mixed or average reviews". Audiences polled by CinemaScore gave the film an average grade of "A−" on an A+ to F scale.

BBC Radio 5 Live's film critic Mark Kermode admitted to enjoying the film, despite describing the experience as "the closest you get to see A-List actors doing drunken karaoke". Peter Bradshaw of The Guardian was more negative, giving it one star, and expressed a "need to vomit". Bob Chipman of Escape to the Movies said it was "so base, so shallow and so hinged on meaningless spectacle, it's amazing it wasn't made for men". The Daily Telegraph stated that it was enjoyable but poorly put together: "Finding the film a total shambles was sort of a shame, but I have a sneaking suspicion I'll go to see it again anyway." Angie Errigo of Empire said it was "cute, clean, camp fun, full of sunshine and toe tappers."

The casting of actors not known for their singing abilities led to some mixed reviews. Variety stated that "some stars, especially the bouncy and rejuvenated Streep, seem better suited for musical comedy than others, including Brosnan and Skarsgård." Brosnan, especially, was savaged by many critics: his singing was compared to "a water buffalo" (New York Magazine), "a donkey braying" (The Philadelphia Inquirer) and "a wounded raccoon" (The Miami Herald), and Matt Brunson of Creative Loafing Charlotte said he "looks physically pained choking out the lyrics, as if he's being subjected to a prostate exam just outside of the camera's eye."

Accolades

Sequel

Mamma Mia! Here We Go Again was announced on May 19, 2017, with a planned release date of July 20, 2018. It was written and directed by Ol Parker. It was announced that Seyfried, Cooper, Streep, Firth and Brosnan would be returning. In July 2017, Lily James was confirmed to portray young Donna. The film took almost five months to film and was released in London and Sweden on July 16, 2018, and was released worldwide on July 20, 2018. The film was a commercial success and made $402 million worldwide with a $75 million budget. Reviews were generally positive, with critics praising the performances and musical numbers. The film was released digitally on October 9, 2018, and on DVD on October 23, 2018. It held the top spot on the charts for the week ending November 3, 2018.

See also
Lace, 1984 miniseries about a daughter who tries to figure out which of three women is her mother

References

Further reading
 Louise FitzGerald (ed.), Melanie Williams (ed.): Mamma Mia! The Movie: Exploring a Cultural Phenomenon. I.B. Tauris, 2013,

External links
 
 
 
 
 
 

ABBA
2000s musical comedy films
2008 romantic comedy films
2000s romantic musical films
2000s American films
2008 films
American musical comedy films
American romantic comedy films
American romantic musical films
British musical comedy films
British romantic comedy films
2000s English-language films
2000s Greek-language films
Films about weddings
Films based on musicals
Films based on songs
Films produced by Gary Goetzman
Films scored by Benny Andersson
Films set in the 2000s
Films set in hotels
Films set in Greece
Films set in the Mediterranean Sea
Films set on islands
Films shot at Pinewood Studios
Films shot in California
Films shot in Greece
Films shot in Thessaly
Films shot in London
Films shot in Morocco
Jukebox musical films
Universal Pictures films
Mamma Mia!
2008 directorial debut films
Films about mother–daughter relationships
Films directed by Phyllida Lloyd
American female buddy films
Golden Raspberry Award winning films
2000s female buddy films
2000s British films